Hideaway is a jazz club in Streatham, south London which features live performances of jazz, funk, swing and soul music as well as stand-up comedy nights. It opened in 2010 and won the Jazz Venue/Promoter of the Year category in the 2011 Parliamentary Jazz Awards.

References

External links
Official website

2010 establishments in England
Clubs and societies in London
Jazz clubs in London
Streatham